Terrinches is a municipality located in the province of Ciudad Real, Castile-La Mancha, Spain. It has a population of 773 (2014). It contains the church of Santo Domingo de Guzman.

Municipalities in the Province of Ciudad Real